15 let Kasakhstan is a village located in the Gabit Musirepov District of North Kazakhstan Region in northern Kazakhstan. Population:

References 

Populated places in North Kazakhstan Region